Wellstye Green or Wells Tye Green is a hamlet located between the villages of High Easter and Barnston, in the Uttlesford district of Essex.

It is the location of the Anglian Land Drainage Ltd (at Mawkinsherds Farm).

References 

Uttlesford
Hamlets in Essex